269 (two hundred [and] sixty-nine) is the natural number between 268 and 270. It is also a prime number.

In mathematics
269 is a twin prime,
and a Ramanujan prime.
It is the largest prime factor of 9! + 1 = 362881,
and the smallest natural number that cannot be represented as the determinant of a 10 × 10 (0,1)-matrix.

References

Integers